The 1975 German motorcycle Grand Prix was the fourth round of the 1975 Grand Prix motorcycle racing season. It took place on the weekend of 9–11 May 1975 at the Hockenheimring.

500cc classification

References

German motorcycle Grand Prix
German
German Motorcycle Grand Prix